This is a timeline of Tanzanian history, comprising important legal and territorial changes and political events in Tanzania and its predecessor states.  To read about the background to these events, see History of Tanzania.  See also the list of presidents of Tanzania.

Early Pleistocene

3rd millennium BC

6th century BC

1st century BC

1st century AD

2nd century AD

4th century AD

7th century AD

11th century

12th century

13th century

14th century

15th century

16th century

17th century

18th century

19th century

20th century

21st century

See also
 Timeline of Dar es Salaam
 Timeline of Zanzibar City

Notes

References 

General

Specific

Bibliography
  
 
 

 
Tanzanian
Years in Tanzania